René Cousineau (17 June 1930 – 10 September 2002) was a Liberal party member of the House of Commons of Canada. Cousineau was born in Gatineau, Quebec and became a developer. He also practiced and taught notary law.

He was elected at Gatineau riding in the 1979 federal election and re-elected in 1980. Cousineau was defeated by Claudy Mailly of the Progressive Conservative party in the 1984 federal election.

Electoral record

External links
 

1930 births
2002 deaths
Liberal Party of Canada MPs
Members of the House of Commons of Canada from Quebec
Politicians from Gatineau